Brendan Michael McCann (born July 5, 1935) is an American former professional basketball player. McCann was selected in the 1957 NBA Draft (first round, fifth overall) by the New York Knicks after a collegiate career at St. Bonavanture. He played for the Knicks for three seasons followed by six years playing in the Eastern Professional Basketball League for the Allentown Jets.
He was the varsity basketball coach at North Babylon High School from 1961-1967. His first two years, the team's record was 4 wins and 14 losses. In the 1963-1964 season, the team record was 13 wins and 5 losses and he coached the Bulldogs to their first county playoff game. For the next three years, North Babylon had winning records and went to the county playoffs. He retired from coaching in 1967.
He was inducted into the Suffolk County Sport's Hall of Fame in the late 1990s.

References

1935 births
Living people
Allentown Jets players
American men's basketball players
Basketball players from New York City
New York Knicks draft picks
New York Knicks players
Point guards
Sportspeople from Brooklyn
St. Bonaventure Bonnies men's basketball players